Khramort or Pirlar is a village de facto in the Askeran Province of the Republic of Artsakh, de jure in the Khojaly District of Azerbaijan, in the disputed region of Nagorno-Karabakh. The village has an ethnic Armenian-majority population, and also had an Armenian majority in 1989.

History 
During the Soviet period, the village was a part of the Askeran District of the Nagorno-Karabakh Autonomous Oblast.

Armenpress reported that Azerbaijan continuously violated the 2020 Nagorno-Karabakh ceasefire agreement in the direction of the village.

Historical heritage sites 
Historical heritage sites in and around the village include a 13th-century khachkar, the 19th-century church of Surb Astvatsatsin, a 19th/20th-century cemetery, as well as World War II and Artsakh War memorials.

Economy and culture 
The population is mainly engaged in agriculture and animal husbandry. As of 2015, the village has a municipal building, a house of culture, a secondary school and a medical centre.

Demographics 
The village had 403 inhabitants in 2005, and 524 inhabitants in 2015.

References

External links 
 
 

Populated places in Askeran Province
Populated places in Khojaly District